Giovanni Giacomo de Rossi (1627 – 1691) was an Italian engraver and printer, active in Rome in the second half of the 17th century.

His father, Giuseppe de Rossi (1570-1639), was the founder of the most important and active printing press of the 17th century in Rome. The printing press begun in 1633, by Giuseppe de Rossi, and it passed firstly to Giovanni Giacomo and to his brother Giandomenico (1619-1653), and then later to Lorenzo Filippo (1682-?); in 1738 it became the Calcografia Camerale, from 1870 until 1945 the Regia Calcografica, and today it is known as the Calcografia Nazionale. Here are conserved, amongst many others, the plates of Giambattista Piranesi (1720-1778).

Giovanni Giacomo de Rossi was the most involved of all the various family members who ran the press, and he worked between 1638 and 1691, and was to take the company to the height of its success. The artists that he printed the etchings for included Giovanni Benedetto Castiglione (1609-1665), Pietro Testa (1612-1650) and Giovan Francesco Grimaldi (1606–1680).

References

Italian publishers (people)
Italian printers
Italian engravers